The Golem is the name of a number of fictional characters appearing in American comic books published by Marvel Comics. These include:

Monster

Publication history
The Golem first appeared in Strange Tales #174 (June 1974), and was created by Len Wein and John Buscema.

The character also appears in Strange Tales #176-177 (October, December 1974), Marvel Two-in-One #11 (September 1975), The Hood #3 (September 2002), #5-6 (November–December 2002), and Nick Fury's Howling Commandos #2 (February 2006).

Fictional character biography
Golem is a humanoid creature that was made in the 16th century by Judah Loew Ben Bezalel.  It was made from purple stone or clay and protected the Jewish people from persecutors in Prague.  In later years it was reanimated by Professor Abraham Adamson’s life force as Adamson died.

Golem later became a member of S.H.I.E.L.D.’s Howling Commandos Monster Force.

Powers and abilities

Invaders ally

Publication history
This character first appeared in Invaders #12 (January 1977) as Goldstein, and was created by Roy Thomas, Frank Robbins and Frank Springer; he appeared in Invaders #13 (February 1977) as Golem.

The character subsequently appears in The Invaders #2-4 (June–August 1993).

Fictional character biography
Jacob Goldstein, the brother of the Blue Bullet, was a resident of the Jewish ghetto of Warsaw, Poland, during World War II.  He mystically transformed himself into a Golem in order to fight the Nazis. He assisted the Invaders when his brother was kidnapped by Doctor Death.

Powers and abilities
His skin was hard as stone, giving him a good degree of invulnerability. His strength was greater than Captain America's but less than Namor's.

Hood foe

Dennis Golembuski was the grandson of a Polish freedom fighter who immigrated to America. Dennis may or may not have killed a man at the age of eight. He spent some time working as an underboss for Kingpin, but he quit. He began to work for a mysterious new master.

Later he had Mosh brought to him for robbing a liquor store under his "protection". Mosh refused to hand over a percentage of his take from the robbery. So Golem and his assistant Madame Rapier kill Mosh. He recruited the Constrictor, Shocker and Jack O'Lantern to help protect a batch of "bloodstones". After the Hood arrived and stole half the diamonds, he gave Madam Rapier a list of pawn shops for them to scout, in case Hood tried to sell them. Hood arrived at the Golem's office and asking for a cut of the diamonds if he returned the rest undamaged. Golem agreed, but after the Hood left, told Rapier to kill the thief at their rendezvous.

After the Hood double-crossed Rapier, knowing she planned to double-cross him, she was killed in a hail of police gunfire. The Hood confronted Jack O'Lantern and the other super villains. He handed the diamonds over to them, telling them to tell Golem to just leave him alone. After they reported back to him, he promised that nothing was ended between him and the Hood.

Powers and abilities
Dennis apparently possesses no powers beyond those of a normal man his age.

Other Golems
Joseph, a resident of Yancy Street, was known as Golem.  Joseph was brought over to the United States from the old country by Loew, the creator of the original Golem.  Joseph was buried under a building as persecutors dropped away and unearthed decades later with the building's destruction.  He began mimicking the protective/defensive actions of the Yancy Street Gang against outsiders but was confronted by the Thing.  He was then sent to sleep in the East River by Grimm. Golem first appeared in Marvel Knights 4 #22 (November, 2005). He was created by Roberto Aguirre-Sacasa (writer) and Valentine De Landro (artist).
In Warheads #2, a being known as Golem briefly possessed Leona MacBride and then Mr. Grant.
A member of the Vampire Hunters is Inspector Judiah Golem.  He first appeared in Tomb of Dracula vol. 3 #4.
Agents of Cagliostro were known as the Golems.  They first appeared in Dr. Strange Annual #2.

Reception
The Golem was ranked #26 on a listing of Marvel Comics' monster characters in 2015.

Bibliography
Incredible Hulk vol. 2 #134
Marvel Handbook: The 1970
Marvel Two-In-One #11
Nick Fury's Howling Commandos #1-6
Strange Tales #174, 176-177

See also

References

External links

Articles about multiple fictional characters
Characters created by Brian K. Vaughan
Characters created by Eric Powell
Characters created by Frank Robbins
Characters created by John Buscema
Characters created by Kyle Hotz
Characters created by Len Wein
Characters created by Roy Thomas
Comics characters introduced in 1974
Comics characters introduced in 1977
Comics characters introduced in 2002
Fictional golems
Fictional people from the 16th-century
Fictional people from the 20th-century
Fictional Polish Jews
Fictional Polish people
Jewish-related comics
Marvel Comics characters with superhuman strength
Marvel Comics demons
Marvel Comics male superheroes
Marvel Comics male supervillains
Marvel Comics superheroes
Marvel Comics supervillains
it:Golem (personaggio)